A distaff (also called a rock), is a tool used in spinning. It is designed to hold the unspun fibers, keeping them untangled and thus easing the spinning process. It is most commonly used to hold flax and sometimes wool, but can be used for any type of fibre. Fiber is wrapped around the distaff and tied in place with a piece of ribbon or string. The word comes from Low German dis, meaning a bunch of flax, connected with staff.

As an adjective, the term distaff is used to describe the female side of a family. The corresponding term for the male side of a family is the "spear" side.

Form

In Western Europe, there were two common forms of distaves, depending on the spinning method. The traditional form is a staff held under one's arm while using a spindle – see the figure illustration. This version is the older of the two, as spindle spinning predates spinning on a wheel.

A distaff can also be mounted as an attachment to a spinning wheel. On a wheel, it is placed next to the bobbin, where it is in easy reach of the spinner. This version is shorter, but otherwise does not differ from the spindle version.

By contrast, the traditional Russian distaff, used both with spinning wheels and with spindles, is L-shaped and consists of a horizontal board, known as the dontse, and a flat vertical piece, frequently oar-shaped, to the inner side of which the bundle of fibers was tied or pinned. The spinner sat on the dontse, with the vertical piece of the distaff to her left, and drew the fibers out with her left hand. The distaff was often richly carved and painted and was an important element of Russian folk art.

Recently, handspinners have begun using wrist distaves to hold their fiber; these are made of flexible material, such as braided yarn, and can swing freely from the wrist. A wrist distaff generally consists of a loop with a tail, at the end of which is a tassel, often with beads on each strand. The spinner wraps the roving or tow around the tail and through the loop to keep it out of the way, and to keep it from getting snagged.

Dressing
Dressing a distaff is the act of wrapping the fiber around the distaff. With flax, the wrapping is done by laying the flax fibers down, approximately parallel to each other and the distaff, then carefully rolling the fibers onto the distaff. A ribbon or string is then tied at the top and loosely wrapped around the fibers to keep them in place.

Other meanings

The term distaff is also used as an adjective to describe the matrilineal branch of a family, i.e., to the person's mother and her blood relatives. This term developed in the English-speaking communities where a distaff spinning tool was used often to symbolize domestic life.  Proverbs 31 cites the "wife of noble character" as one who "holds the distaff".

One still-recognized use of the term is in horse racing, in which races limited to female horses are referred to as distaff races. From 1984 until 2007, at the American Breeders' Cup, the major race for fillies and mares was the Breeders' Cup Distaff. From 2008 to 2012, the event was referred to as the Breeders' Cup Ladies' Classic. Starting in 2013, the name of the race changed back to Breeders' Cup Distaff. It is commonly regarded as the female analog of the better-known Breeders' Cup Classic, though female horses are not barred from entering that race. 

The phrase "on the distaff side" was commonly used by reporters covering athletic competitions when transitioning from men's events over to the highlights of women's events.  

In Norse mythology, the goddess Frigg spins clouds from her bejewelled distaff in the Norse constellation known as Frigg's Spinning Wheel (Friggerock, also known as Orion's belt).

In popular culture
 The Women's division of the mixed-martial-arts organization EXC (Elite Xtreme Combat) is known as the "Distaff Division".
 In the video game Loom by Lucasfilm Games (1990), the Weavers' Guild, the game's equivalent to wizards, and the main character, Bobbin Threadbare, use wooden staves called "distaffs" to control their magic, with which they "weave the very fabric of reality".

See also
 Distaff Day
 Spindle (textiles)
 Wand

References

External links
 Instructions on making a recycled-sock wrist distaff

Hand spinning tools
Flax
Symbols of Athena